Churri is an Indian spicy side dish, made from yogurt, buttermilk and chiles. It is traditionally preferred as a side dish with Biryani and roasted meats, it is a refreshing supplement to a variety of spicy dishes.

See also
 List of yogurt-based dishes and beverages

References

Balochi cuisine
Indian cuisine
Yogurt-based dishes